is a 1971 single released by the Japanese duo Jiros.
Released on February 5, 1971, it ranked eleventh in Oricon charts, selling a total of 196,000 copies. 
The song was adapted into a movie with the same name in 1973.

Background 
In the early 1970s, when "Children Who Don't Know War" was released, the United States of America found itself in the midst of the Vietnam War. Though Japan wasn't directly involved in the conflict, the country allowed the  stationing of American troops on Japanese soil, a decision which was met with internal criticism coming mainly from the country's intellectual elite, composed of academics and students, who upheld deep rooted anti-war beliefs, mainly due to Japan's experience during World War II.

Though the duo never bore any affiliation to the pacifist movement, the song, composed to express a mild anti-war message, but later regarded by Kitayama as a puerile effort to satirize, and rebel against, the contempt felt by older generations who experienced World War II for younger people born in the post-war period – who were denounced for weak-mindedness and lack of self-discipline – became indelibly attached to the movement and its title an iconic expression, used in sports, anime, magazines, books and newspaper articles

Track listings 
 A side – 
 Lyrics: , Composition: , Arrangement: 
 B side – 
 Lyrics: , Composition: , Arrangement:

References

1971 singles
Anti-war songs
1971 songs